Sphenomorphus sungaicolus  is a species of skink found in Malaysia.

References

sungaicolus
Reptiles described in 2016